Torben Joneleit (born 17 May 1987) is a former professional footballer who played as a centre-back. Born in Monaco, he made one appearance for the Germany U21 national team.

Career 
Joneleit joined Scottish Premier League club Hibernian on what was originally intended to be a year's loan from Monaco for the 2007–08 season on 26 June 2007. In January 2008, however, Joneleit returned to Monaco after failing to make the first team on a regular basis. Mixu Paatelainen, the club's manager, said it would be better for the player's development if he were to return to Monaco.

On 30 January 2009, Joneleit joined Belgian side Charleroi on loan until the end of the 2008–09 season. He again linked up with John Collins, who had also been his manager at Hibs.

During the 2009 close season he signed a three-year deal with KRC Genk.

Honours
Genk
Belgian Pro League: 2010–11
Belgian Super Cup: 2011

Notes

External links

Voetbal International 

1987 births
Living people
People from Monte Carlo
German footballers
Association football central defenders
Germany under-21 international footballers
Monegasque footballers
Monegasque people of German descent
AS Monaco FC players
Hibernian F.C. players
R. Charleroi S.C. players
K.R.C. Genk players
Scottish Premier League players
Belgian Pro League players
German expatriate footballers
Monegasque expatriate footballers
German expatriate sportspeople in Monaco
German expatriate sportspeople in Belgium
Expatriate footballers in Belgium
German expatriate sportspeople in Scotland
Expatriate footballers in Scotland